Martin Lotz (born 28 May 1938) is a German former athlete. He competed in the men's hammer throw at the 1964 Summer Olympics.

References

External links
 

1938 births
Living people
Athletes (track and field) at the 1964 Summer Olympics
German male hammer throwers
Olympic athletes of the United Team of Germany
People from Göttingen (district)
Sportspeople from Lower Saxony